The Fisher Covered Railroad Bridge is a covered bridge in Wolcott, Vermont. Built in 1908, it originally carried the St. Johnsbury and Lamoille County Railroad line over the Lamoille River. Now closed, it was the last covered bridge in Vermont to carry railroad traffic, and is a rare surviving example in the state of a double Town lattice truss.  It was listed on the National Register of Historic Places in 1974.

Description and history

The Fisher Covered Railroad Bridge stands in a rural area southeast of the village center of Wolcott, south of Vermont Route 15. It spans the Lamoille River in a northwest-southeast orientation, and is accessed from a small parking area just to the north. It rests on stone abutments capped in concrete. The bridge is covered by a gabled roof which has a distinctive central monitor for much of its length. The exterior of the bridge is clad in vertical board siding which rises most of the way to the roof, leaving an open strip at the top of the sides. The siding extends into the portals a short way, and there is a band of skirt-style siding extending below the main siding. The decking now has a steel I-beam substructure, leaving the trusses to only support the superstructure.

The bridge was built in 1908, and was, at the time of its listing on the National Register in 1974, the last covered bridge in the state to carry railroad traffic.  It was built by the Boston and Maine Railroad on the route of the St. Johnsbury and Lamoille County Railroad, which it controlled. In 1968, it was threatened with demolition in favor of a steel truss. A pier was built under the bridge, and four steel girders were installed to support the bridge's load.

See also
National Register of Historic Places listings in Lamoille County, Vermont
List of Vermont covered bridges
List of bridges on the National Register of Historic Places in Vermont

References

External links

http://www.virtualvermont.com/coveredbridges/fisher.html

Buildings and structures in Wolcott, Vermont
Covered bridges on the National Register of Historic Places in Vermont
Covered bridges in Lamoille County, Vermont
Railroad bridges in Vermont
Bridges completed in 1908
Wooden bridges in Vermont
Lattice truss bridges in the United States
1908 establishments in Vermont